Sir Byrom Bramwell FRSE LLD (18 December 1847 – 27 April 1931) was an eminent British physician and medical author.  He was a general physician, but became known for his work in  neurology, diseases of the heart and blood, and disorders of the endocrine organs. He was president of  the Royal College of Physicians of Edinburgh.

Early life 
Bramwell was born on 18 December 1847 in North Shields in northern England, the son of Mary Young and Dr John Byrom Bramwell.

He was educated at Cheltenham College and then in 1865 travelled to Scotland to study medicine at the University of Edinburgh. There he studied under the eminent anatomist,  John Goodsir, John Hughes Bennett, James Syme, and James Young Simpson, a truly luminary group of teachers, evidencing Edinburgh’s position in the forefront of medical education. A keen sportsman, Bramwell also captained the University cricket team.

Career 
In 1869 he becamef house surgeon under James Spence at the Royal Infirmary of Edinburgh, but his father’s sudden illness caused him to return to North Shields to take up his role as a local general practitioner. Intent on a career in hospital medicine, in 1874 he took over the role of physician  and pathologist at Newcastle Royal Infirmary.

In 1879 he returned to Edinburgh to work as a physician, becoming a member of the Royal College of Physicians in 1880. In 1885 he was living at 23 Drumsheugh Gardens, next door to Dr Kirk Duncanson. 

He became a lecturer in the Edinburgh Extra-mural School of Medicine. In this post he  took part in  the education of women medical students who were still at that time  excluded from the  University of Edinburgh.   He was made pathologist to the  Royal Infirmary of Edinburgh in 1882 and assistant physician in 1885. In 1897 he was appointed a physician at the Royal Infirmary. Bramwell was among the first to teach clinical medicine to women at the  Infirmary. In 1900 he applied unsuccessfully  for the Chair of Medicine at the University of Edinburgh.

Bramwell was a prolific writer publishing ten textbooks and some 160 papers. His first major work Diseases of the Spinal Cord (1881), was translated into French, German and Russian, and won great popularity in the United States.  ’’Intracranial Tumours’’ (1888) also won international acclaim. Among students and contemporaries he had a reputation as an outstanding  clinical teacher and  diagnostician.

In 1908 he was elected a member of the Aesculapian Club. He succeeded William Allan Jamieson as President of the Royal College of Physicians of Edinburgh in 1910. He was knighted by King George V in 1924.

He died at his home, 10 Heriot Row in Edinburgh, on 27 April 1931 and was buried in Dean Cemetery close to his former anatomy teacher  John Goodsir.

His house at Heriot Row is the central pavilion of the "palace block" terrace; three storeys over pavement, one attic storey and two basement levels - six storeys in total.

Family

In 1872 he married Martha Crighton (died 1919) in 1872., and together they had two daughters and three sons, J. Crighton Bramwell, a physician who became Professor of Cardiology in Manchester, Professor Edwin Bramwell FRSE (1873–1952), a neurologist whose career closely followed that of his father, and Byrom Stanley Bramwell FRSE (1877–1948), who became an advocate.

Positions held and distinctions 
President of the Royal College of Physicians in Edinburgh 1910–1912
Fellow of the Royal Society of Edinburgh (1886)
Received the honorary degree of LLD from the universities of Edinburgh, Birmingham, St Andrews, and of DCL from the University of Durham.
Knighted in 1924

Publications
See
’’Diseases of the Spinal Cord’’ (1881)
Practice of Physic (1883) co-written with James Ormiston Affleck
’’Intracranial Tumours’’ (1888)
’’Atlas of Clinical Medicine’’ 3 vols (1892-6)
’’Lectures on Aphasia’’ (1897)
’’Anaemia and some Diseases of the Blood Forming Organs and Ductless Glands’’ (1899)

References

1847 births
1931 deaths
British surgeons
Alumni of the University of Edinburgh
Academics of the University of Edinburgh
Scottish medical writers
Presidents of the Royal College of Physicians of Edinburgh
Fellows of the Royal Society of Edinburgh
Burials at the Dean Cemetery